Electoral history of Wayne Morse, United States Senator from Oregon, candidate for the 1960 Democratic presidential nomination and Oregon favorite-son candidate in the 1952 Republican presidential primaries.

Originally a Republican, Morse became an independent in 1952 and a Democrat in 1955.

1944

1950

1952 
Oregon Republican presidential primary, 1952:
 Dwight D. Eisenhower - 172,486 (64.55%)
 Earl Warren - 44,034 (16.48%)
 Douglas MacArthur - 18,603 (6.96%)
 Robert A. Taft (write-in) - 18,009 (6.74%)
 Wayne Morse - 7,105 (2.66%)
 Harold Stassen - 6,610 (2.47%)
 William R. Schneider - 350 (0.13%)

1952 Republican presidential primaries:
 Robert A. Taft - 2,794,736 (35.84%)
 Dwight D. Eisenhower - 2,050,708 (26.30%)
 Earl Warren - 1,349,036 (17.30%)
 Harold Stassen - 881,702 (11.31%)
 Thomas H. Werdel - 521,110 (6.68%)
 George T. Mickelson - 63,879 (0.82%)
 Douglas MacArthur - 44,209 (0.57%)
 Grant A. Ritter - 26,208 (0.34%)
 Edward C. Slettedahl - 22,712 (0.29%)
 Riley A. Bender - 22,321 (0.29%)
 Mary E. Kenny - 10,411 (0.13%)
 Wayne Morse - 7,105 (0.09%)
 Perry J. Stearns - 2,925 (0.04%)
 William R. Schneider - 580 (0.01%)

1956

1960 
District of Columbia Democratic presidential primary, 1960:
 Hubert Humphrey - 8,239 (57.35%)
 Wayne Morse - 6,127 (42.65%)

Maryland Democratic presidential primary, 1960: 
 John F. Kennedy - 201,769 (70.31%)
 Wayne Morse - 49,420 (17.22%)
 Unpledged - 24,350 (8.49%)
 Lar Daly - 7,536 (2.63%)
 Andrew J. Easter - 3,881 (1.35%)

Oregon Democratic presidential primary, 1960:
 John F. Kennedy - 146,332 (50.97%)
 Wayne Morse - 91,715 (31.95%)
 Hubert Humphrey - 16,319 (5.68%)
 Stuart Symington - 12,496 (4.35%)	
 Lyndon B. Johnson - 11,101 (3.87%)
 Adlai Stevenson (write-in) - 7,924 (2.76%)
 Others - 1,210 (0.42%)

1960 Democratic presidential primaries:
 John F. Kennedy - 1,847,259 (31.43%)
 Pat Brown - 1,354,031 (23.04%)
 George H. McLain - 646,387 (11.00%)
 Hubert Humphrey - 590,410 (10.05%)
 George Smathers - 322,235 (5.48%)
 Michael DiSalle - 315,312 (5.37%)
 Unpledged - 241,958 (4.12%)
 Albert S. Porter - 208,057 (3.54%)
 Wayne Morse - 147,262 (2.51%)
 Adlai Stevenson - 51,833 (0.88%)
 Lar Daly - 48,389 (0.82%)
 John H. Latham - 42,084 (0.72%)
 Stuart Symington - 29,740 (0.51%)
 Richard Nixon - 16,899 (0.29%)
 Lyndon B. Johnson - 15,691 (0.27%)

1962

1968

Primary election

General election

1972 

Democratic nomination for the Vice President of the United States, 1972:

Vote to replace original candidate Thomas Eagleton, nominated at the 1972 Democratic National Convention and then removed from the ticket

 Sargent Shriver - 2,936 (97.44%)
 Thomas Eagleton - 73 (2.42%)
 Wayne Morse - 4 (0.13%)

1974 

Note: Morse died before the general election and was replaced on the ballot by Betty Roberts.

References

Morse, Wayne
History of Oregon
Politics of Oregon